Donald Edward Townsend (17 September 1930 – 29 July 2020) was an English footballer who played as a left back in the Football League. He was the father of former Ireland international Andy Townsend.

Townsend died on 29 July 2020, at the age of 89.

References

External links

1930 births
2020 deaths
English footballers
Sportspeople from Swindon
Association football defenders
Charlton Athletic F.C. players
Trowbridge Town F.C. players
Crystal Palace F.C. players
English Football League players